A postgraduate certificate (abbreviated as PGCert, PG Cert or PGC is a postgraduate qualification at the level of a master's degree.

Like a postgraduate diploma, it is standard practice to use 'PGCert' as a post-nominal designation after completing the certificate course.

United Kingdom
In United Kingdom, postgraduate certificate is a postgraduate qualification at the level of a master's degree (level 7 of the Framework for Higher Education Qualifications in England, Wales and Northern Ireland, level 11 of the Framework for Qualification of Higher Education Institutes in Scotland). Postgraduate certificates require a shorter period of study than master's degrees or postgraduate diplomas, typically equivalent to 225 contact hours or one-third of a full-time academic year. They should not be confused with graduate certificates, which are at the level of a bachelor's degree in the United Kingdom.

Although requirements vary depending on the program, a certificate program represents a focused collection of courses that, when completed, affords the student a record of academic accomplishment in a given discipline or set of related disciplines. The standard entry requirement is a UK honours degree or an equivalent foreign qualification.

Postgraduate Certificate in Education

The Postgraduate Certificate in Education  (PGCertEd) is the title used for postgraduate qualifications in education England, Wales and Northern Ireland at the level of master's degrees; in Scotland the title Postgraduate Diploma in Education or Professional Graduate Diploma in Education is used. Professional Certificate in Education is the title used for qualifications at bachelor's degree level.

Certificate of Postgraduate Studies
The Certificate of Postgraduate Studies (CPGS, also called Certificate in Postgraduate Studies or Certificate in Postgraduate Study) is a postgraduate certificate offered by a variety of British universities. It is typically taken as the first year exam of a PhD-course and aims at making sure that the student has learnt the necessary knowledge for successfully working on their PhD.

Ireland
In Ireland a postgraduate certificate (PgCert/Pg.Cert.) is a postgraduate qualification at the level of a master's degree (level 9 of the National Framework for Qualifications). Postgraduate certificates have a typical study duration of maximum two years. The typical standard of entry for a postgraduate certificate programme of study is an honour in an undergraduate degree.

References 

Educational qualifications in the United Kingdom